Gulou Subdistrict is a subdistrict and the seat of Miyun District of Beijing, China. It borders Miyun Town and Tanying Ethnic Township to its north, Mujiayu Town to its east, Henanzhai Town to its south, and Guoyuan Subdistrict to its west. As of 2020, it had a population of 154,739.

The subdistrict was created in 2005 from part of Miyun Town. its name Gulou originates from the Miyun Drum Tower that used to exist within the region.

Administrative divisions 
Here is a list of the 29 communities under Gulou Subdistrict as of 2021:

Gallery

See also 
 List of township-level divisions of Beijing

References

Subdistricts of Beijing
Miyun District